Villatuerta (adaptation in Basque: Bilatorta) is a town and municipality located in the autonomous community of Navarre, Spain.

References

External links
 VILLATUERTA in the Bernardo Estornés Lasa - Auñamendi Encyclopedia (Euskomedia Fundazioa) 

Municipalities in Navarre